The swimming competitions at the 2007 Pan American Games consisted of 34 events,
 held on and at:
pool: July 16–22, Maria Lenk Aquatic Park
open water (10K races): July 14, Copacabana Beach

Thiago Pereira won eight medals (six gold, one silver and one bronze) and became the winner of the most medals in a single edition of the Games, equaling the Costa Rican swimmer Silvia Poll—who won eight medals at 1987 in Indianapolis. Pereira also surpassed the five gold mark that belonged to Mark Spitz in the 1967 Pan Am Games in Winnipeg

In this edition, three countries have won, for the first time, a medal in swimming at the Pan American Games: Cayman Islands, Bahamas and Barbados.

Pool schedule

Results

Men's events

* Swimmers who participated in the heats only and received medals.

Women's events

* Swimmers who participated in the heats only and received medals.

Medal table

References

Official Site
Full results by UOL
"For the Record" section, Swimming World Magazine, September 2007 (p. 48+49).

 
Pan American Games
Swimming at the Pan American Games
Events at the 2007 Pan American Games